Dr. Mohamed Rela is an Indian surgeon. He is known for his expertise in liver transplantation and hepatopancreatobiliary (HPB) surgery. He is considered one of the world's best liver transplant surgeons. He made his name in the Guinness Book of Records for performing a liver transplantation on a 5-day-old baby.

He is the chairman and director of Dr Rela Hospital, India and the Professor of Liver Surgery and Transplantation, at the King's College Hospital, London.

Education
Prof. Mohamed Rela was born in Kiliyanur village near Mayiladuthurai in Tamil Nadu, India. His parents are Haji S A Shamsudin and Hasma Beevi.  He was a student of the Besant Theosophical High School School, Adyar Chennai and received his MBBS (in 1980) and MS degree from the Stanley Medical College, Chennai.

He later went to the United Kingdom in 1986, to receive another MS from  Edinburgh and become a Fellow of theRoyal College of Surgeons in 1988.

Career
Prof. Mohamed Rela worked in various hospitals in UK before joining London's King's College Hospital in 1991, where he continues to be the Professor of liver surgery. Niche areas of liver transplantation like auxiliary transplantation, split liver transplantation techniques and live donor liver transplantation were pioneered by him at the King's College for the world to emulate, and scores of patients to benefit.

In a career over 3 decades, Prof. Rela has performed over 4500 liver transplants, including one on a five-day-old baby, earning him an entry into the Guinness Book of Records in 2000.

Prof. Rela currently works in India, where he set up a successful Living Donor Liver Transplant program performing over 250 liver transplants a year, having performed over a 1500 liver transplants in a short span of 8 years. He was also the catalyst in starting liver transplants in tier 2 cities in Tamil Nadu, providing access to such high end medical facilities even to people from far flung places.

Rela is also a hepatobiliary surgeon, performing Whipple's surgery for pancreatic cancer, liver resections for Cholangiocarcinoma and HCC resection in Cirrhotic patients. His research interest is in the field of clinical liver transplantation, translational studies into liver regeneration and liver preservation . He has over 600 publications in peer-reviewed journals.

Enterprises 
Further he has been honoured with Doctorate of Science degrees from three universities, recognising his service to healthcare. With a focus on a strong, dedicated yet ethical concept of healthcare, Prof. Rela has now ventured into an enterprise, setting up a new healthcare facility, Dr. Rela Institute and Medical Centre.

The new centre, an International Medical facility is a quaternary care hospital dedicated to fostering and responding to the needs of a diverse set of patients. The hospital is committed to being an internationally significant health care system with the state-of- the- art infrastructure facilities, functioning in a sprawling area of 36 acres of land located in Chromepet, Chennai, India.

With the facility of 450 beds inclusive of 130 critical care beds, 14 operating rooms, contemporary reference laboratories and radiology services. The institute is designed to provide highly expertised care in all specialties with special focus on care of critical illness and multi-organ transplantation. This hospital houses one of the world's largest dedicated liver intensive care units. In addition to the quality quaternary care in all specialties, the hospital is committed to provide day to day ‘primary and secondary care’ to the local population with international standards.

The 'Master Class in Liver Disease' (MCLD) series was envisaged by Prof. Rela as a means to deliver high-quality teaching in liver disease and transplantation.

Since its first edition in 2011, it has quickly established itself as one of the most popular scientific meetings in the field in the Indian sub-continent. Each edition is planned as a single theme conference with participation of national & international experts. Previous editions have dealt with topics such as the pathological basis of liver disease, hepatobiliary tumours, paediatric liver diseases, peri-operative care of the liver recipient, living donor liver transplantation, and acute liver failure.

Achievements
 Prof. Rela has so far performed more than 4500 liver transplant surgeries.
 In December 1997, a team led by him performed a successful liver transplantation for a five-day-old girl, which made him an entry into the Guinness Book of Records in 2000.
 In March 1999, he carried out the first living related liver transplant on a patient with acute liver failure in the UK. 18-month-old Luke Bettelley, was given just 48 hours to live before the operation.
 In June 2003,  he successfully performed a liver transplant for a four-and-a-half-year-old girl from Ahmedabad, Pranali Bhat, suffering from a terminal stage liver disease, at the Global Hospital, Hyderabad.
 In August 2003, he was a part of a team from King's College Hospital, London which did liver transplant(s) six times for a patient to save her life by performing a bone marrow transplant.
 In August 2004, a team led by him has successfully conducted the liver transplantation for a five-year-old Pakistani girl, Batul Hasan, at the Global Hospital, Hyderabad.
 In September 2009, a team led by him successfully performed the split liver transplantation (first of its kind in India), at the Global Hospital, Chennai. The liver was split during the retrieval operation into a smaller left lobe for transplanting a young girl and a larger right lobe for transplanting an older woman with end stage liver disease.
 In May 2011, a team led by him has successfully done Swap liver transplantation on Adults (first of its kind in India), at Global Hospitals & Health city, Chennai.
 He is the only liver surgeon in India with over 600 Scientific Publications.

See also
Liver
Liver transplantation
Liver Disease
Pancreas
Pancreatic disease

References

External links
Home page at Institute of Liver Disease & Transplantation, Global Hospitals & Health City, Chennai, India
Conference page at Master Class in Liver Disease
Staff directory

Profile at KCH, London, UK
Profile at London Bridge Hospital, London, UK

Indian transplant surgeons
Medical doctors from Tamil Nadu
People from Mayiladuthurai district
Year of birth missing (living people)
Living people
Fellows of the Royal College of Surgeons
Tamil physicians
20th-century Indian medical doctors
Liver surgeons
20th-century surgeons